Elections to the Liverpool School Board were held on Tuesday 17 November 1891.

There were twenty-nine candidates for the fifteen board member positions.

Each voter had fifteen votes to cast.

After the election, the composition of the school board was:

* - Retiring board member seeking re-election

Elected

Not Elected

References

1891
Liverpool
1890s in Liverpool
November 1891 events